VB5 may refer to:

Visual Basic (classic), a programming language and programming environment
VB5 interface, a telecommunications interface internal to Broadband ISDNs